Mistress Branican is an 1891 adventure novel written by Jules Verne. It is based on Colonel Peter Egerton-Warburton's and Ernest Giles' accounts of their journeys across the deserts of Western Australia, and was also inspired by the search launched by Lady Franklin when her husband Sir John Franklin was reported lost in the Northwest Passage.

Plot 
The story begins in the United States, where the heroine, Mistress Branican, suffers a mental breakdown after the death by drowning of her young son. On recovering, she learns that her husband, Captain Branican, has been reported lost at sea. Having acquired a fortune, she is able to launch an expedition to search for her husband, who she is convinced is still alive. She leads the expedition herself and trail leads her into the Australian hinterland.

Publication history
1895, United States, New York: Cassell Pub. Co. 377 pp., First US edition
1903, United States, New York: Street & Smith, 377 pp., published under title The Wreck of the Franklin
1970, Australia, Melbourne: Sun Books, 282 pp. Paperback edition

External links

 Mistress Branican available at Jules Verne Collection 

1891 French novels
Novels by Jules Verne